The South Sudan women's national team represents South Sudan in international women's football.

History
South Sudan became independent from Sudan in 2011. That same year the women's team was created.

The team then gained Confederation of African Football (CAF) membership in February 2012 and full FIFA membership in May.

They played their first international at the 2019 CECAFA Women's Championship. They lost the first game 0–9 but managed their first win with a 5–0 over Zanzibar.

Team image

Nicknames
The South Sudan women's national football team has been known or nicknamed as the "Bright Starlets".

Results and fixtures

The following is a list of match results in the last 12 months, as well as any future matches that have been scheduled.

Legend

2022

2023

All-time record

Key

Coaching staff

Current coaching staff

Manager history

Sarah Edward (2011–20??)
Sabino Domaso (20??)
Moses Machar Akol (2019)
Sabino Domaso (20??–20??)
Shilene Booysen (2021–current)

Players

Current squad
This is the official Squad named on May 2022 For 2022 CECAFA Women's Championship  .
 Caps and goals accurate up to and including 30 October 2021.
 Caps and goals accurate up to and including 30 October 2021.

Recent call-ups
The following players have been called up to a South Sudan squad in the past 12 months.

Previous squads
COSAFA Women's Championship 
2021 COSAFA Women's Championship squads
CECAFA Women's Championship
2022 CECAFA Women's Championship squads

Records

*Active players in bold, statistics correct as of 16 July 2022.

Most capped players

Top goalscorers

Competitive record

FIFA Women's World Cup

Olympic Games

*Draws include knockout matches decided on penalty kicks.

Africa Women Cup of Nations
The team was in the draw for qualifying to the 2014 African Championship, but had withdrawn from their first round match against Ethiopia.

*Draws include knockout matches decided on penalty kicks.

African Games

CECAFA Women's Championship

See also
Sport in South Sudan
Football in South Sudan
Women's football in South Sudan
South Sudan women's national under-20 football team
South Sudan women's national under-17 football team
South Sudan national football team

References

External links
FIFA profile

South Sudan women's national football team